Binay Bhushan Das (born November 16 1959) is an Indian politician belonging to the Bharatiya Janata Party (BJP). He was elected as a member of Tripura Legislative Assembly from Panisagar. MLA Binoy Bhusan Das takes oath as Tripura Assembly's Pro-tem Speaker. He was sworn in by Governor Satyadeo Narain Arya in the presence of Chief Minister Manik Saha and his Cabinet colleagues on 15th March, 2023.

Early life and political career 
Bhushan was born on November 16 1959 in Jalabasa, North Tripura to Birendra Kumar Das and Droupadi Das. He has completed his Bachelor of Arts and Bachelors of Law. Bhushan married Sagata Das and has one son and one daughter namely Bishal Das and Sneha Das.

In 2018, he contested the 2018 Legislative Assembly election on a BJP ticket and was fielded against CPM’s Subodh Das. He secured 49.88% of the votes polled and won by 15,892 votes.

References 
9. https://www.thehindu.com/news/national/other-states/bjp-mla-binoy-bhusan-das-takes-oath-as-tripura-assemblys-pro-tem-speaker/article66622157.ece/amp/
1959 births
Bharatiya Janata Party politicians from Tripura
People from North Tripura district
Living people